The men's 4×100 metre freestyle relay competition of the swimming events at the 2011 World Aquatics Championships took place July 24. The heats and final took place July 24.

Records
Prior to the competition, the existing world and championship records were as follows.

Results

Heats

17 teams participated in 3 heats, qualified teams are listed:

Final
The final was held at 19:20.

References

External links
2011 World Aquatics Championships: Men's 4×100 metre freestyle relay entry list, from OmegaTiming.com; retrieved 2011-07-23.

Freestyle 4x100 metre, men's
World Aquatics Championships